The 1986 Tokyo Indoor also known as "Seiko Super Tennis" was a men's tennis tournament played on indoor carpet courts at the Yoyogi National Gymnasium in Tokyo, Japan that was part of the 1986 Nabisco Grand Prix. It was the ninth edition of the tournament and was held from 20 October through 24 October 1986. Matches were the best of three sets. Second-seeded Boris Becker won the singles title.

Finals

Singles

 Boris Becker defeated  Stefan Edberg 7–6, 6–1

Doubles

 Gary Donnelly /  Mike De Palmer defeated  Andrés Gómez /  Ivan Lendl 6–3, 7–5

References

External links
 ITF tournament edition details

Tokyo Indoor
Tokyo Indoor
Tokyo Indoor